This is a list of the gymnasts who represented their country at the 2008 Summer Olympics in Beijing from 8–24 August 2008. Gymnasts across three disciplines (artistic gymnastics, rhythmic gymnastics, and trampoline) participated in the Games.

Women's artistic gymnastics

Men's artistic gymnastics

Rhythmic gymnasts

Individual

Group

Male trampoline gymnasts

Female trampoline gymnasts

Notes

References 

Lists of gymnasts
Gymnastics at the 2008 Summer Olympics